ACFL may refer to:

 Atlantic Coast Football League, minor American football league that operated from 1962 to 1973
 Laois All-County Football League, an annual Gaelic football competition

. Anti Cheaters Fun League, a songpop league organized from September 2014